The
Madhe Sahaba Agitation was a civil disobedience movement launched by Deobandi Muslims of Lucknow in the first half of the twentieth century to counter the commemoration of the tragedy of Karbala during Muharram. It resulted in a widespread Shia-Sunni conflict between the years 1906 – 1909 and turned violent in 1936 – 1939. The conflict spread to other parts of British India.

Background 

In Medieval India, Shiites and Sunnis commemorated Muharram together. Pelsaert gives an account of commemoration of Muharram in Jahangir's reign as follows:

"In commemoration of this tragedy, they wail all night for a period of ten days. The women recite lamentations and display grief. The men carry two decorated coffins on the main roads of the city with many lamps. Large crowds attend these ceremonies, with great cries of mourning and noise. The chief event is on the last night, when it seems as if a Pharoah had killed all the infants in one night. The outcry lasts till the first quarter of the day".

Until the end of the sixteenth century AD, only two anti-Shia books were written in India: Minhaj al-Din by Makhdoom-ul Mulk Mullah Abdullah Sultanpuri and Radd-e Rawafiz by Shaikh Ahmad Sirhindi. Sirhindi approvingly quoted a group of transoxianan ulema:
"Since the Shia permit cursing Abu Bakr, Umar, Uthman and one of the chaste wives (of the Prophet), which in itself constitutes infedality, it is incumbent upon the Muslim ruler, nay upon all people, in compliance with the command of the Omniscient King (Allah), to kill them and to oppress them in order to elevate the true religion. It is permissible to destroy their buildings and to seize their property and belongings."
He has expressed his hate towards Shias in his letters too. According to him, the worst distorters of faith "are those who bear malice against the companions of Prophet Muhammad. God has called them Kafirs in the Quran". In a letter to Sheikh Farid, he said that showing respect to the distortors of faith (ahl-e-Bidʻah) amounted to destruction of Islam. However, there is evidence that Sirhindi later changed his views regarding shias.

As far as armed violence is concerned, the medieval period has only few examples of Shias being killed for their beliefs, most notable incidents are the killing of Abdullah Shah Ghazi in 769 AD, the destruction of Multan in 1005 AD, the persecution of Shias at the hands of Sultan Feroz Shah (1351–1388 AD),  and the target killing of Mullah Ahmad Thathavi in 1589 AD. However, the killer of Mulla Ahmad Thathavi was served justice by Emperor Akbar. The death of Syed Nurullah Shushtari seems to be politically motivated. The region of Srinagar in Kashmir is an exception in Middle Ages with ten bloody Taraaj-e-Shia campaigns.

Troubles between Lucknow's Shias and Sunnis were initiated by Syed Ahmad Barelvi, when he visited towns on Awdh, Bihar and Bengal from 1818 to 1820 to preach his radical ideas. Syed Ahmad repeatedly destroyed ta'ziyas, an act that resulted in subsequent riots and chaos. Barbara Metcalf offers the following explanation to his anti-shi'ism:

A second group of Abuses Syed Ahmad held were those that originated from Shi’i influence. He particularly urged Muslims to give up the keeping of ta’ziyahs. The replicas of the tombs of the martyrs of Karbala taken in procession during the mourning ceremony of Muharram. Muhammad Isma’il wrote,

"a true believer should regard the breaking a tazia by force to be as virtuous an action as destroying idols. If he cannot break them himself, let him order others to do so. If this even be out of his power, let him at least detest and abhor them with his whole heart and soul."

"Sayyid Ahmad himself is said, no doubt with considerable exaggeration, to have torn down thousands of imambaras, the building that house the ta'ziyahs".

This legacy was carried out by his followers, who later split into two new sects, namely the Deobandis and the Ahle Hadith. However till the end of nineteenth century, the anti-Shia sentiment was marginal and the followers of Syed Ahmad Barelvi were small in numbers. Mushirul Hasan says:

"Shia-Sunni relations were not structured around sectarian lines. Some people nursed sectarian prejudices, but most consciously resisted attempts to create fissures in the broadly unified and consensual model of social and cultural living. Regardless of the polemics of the Ulama and the itinerant preachers, bonds of friendship and understanding remained intact because Shias and Sunnis of all classes shared a language, literature and a cultural heritage. That is probably why Sharar observed, though in an exaggerated vein, that no one in Lucknow ever noticed who was a Sunni and who a Shia".

However as modern printing technology, political reforms and fast travel brought social changes, religious identities became politically relevant and religious leaders started to segregate people in order to strengthen their economic and political support base. Lucknow saw clashes between Shias and Sunnis in the 1880s and 1890s.

1908 Riots and Piggot Committee 
By the start of the 1900s, the majority of Sunnis still observed Muharram. Modern lifestyle resulted in Muharram becoming a feast as well as a battleground. As the government gazette noted:

"Shops and booths came to be set up and there were amusements such as swings and merry go rounds. It appears further that women of the town had begun not only to frequent the route of the tazias but to set up tents on the fair ground where they received visitors"

A Deobandi cleric Abdul Shakoor Lakhnavi started to replace the mourning with celebration of moral victory of Imam Hussain over Yazid. He asked Sunnis to wear red or yellow dress instead of black, and carry a decorated charyari flag instead of the traditional black flag. Instead of honouring the Sahaba on their birthdays, he started to arrange public meetings under the banner of Madhe Sahaba (praise of the Companions) in Muharram. He would discuss the lives of the companions that Shias didn't rever and attack Shia beliefs.

Shias submitted a complaint to the office of Lucknow District Magistrate to take notice of the situation ban anything which went against the character of Muharram. Lucknow District administration accepted their demands and stringent rules were put into place for the Ashura procession of 1906. The Sunnis objected to the new rules and therefore, the district administration granted a separate site for Sunnis to bury their taziyah at Nishat Ganj, that came to be known as Karbala Phool Katora. The Sunnis however carried on with the new style of celebrating the Sahaba in the midst of Muharram. Charyari Poems and couplets were recited in the Sunni processions, some of which ‘were positively objectionable in that they contained abuse of Shias and of their beliefs’, and this provoked Shia resentment. They retaliated by reciting Tabarra. Serious riots broke out in 1907 and 1908, after which a four-member committee under the chairmanship of Justice T. C. Piggot, an ICS officer and a judge of High Court, was formed to look into the matter. The conclusion of committee was that "the attempt to transform the tazia processions in honour of first four Caliphs was an innovation". The Committee recommended that there should be general prohibition against the organized recitation of Madhe-Sahaba verses on three days, viz., ashura (the tenth day of Muharram), Chehlum (the fortieth day of ashura), and the twenty-first day of Ramzan. The Government accepted the report of the committee and implemented its recommendations.

Madhe Sahaba Agitation of 1930s 
After the deflation of the Khilafat movement in the 1920s, the clerics had lost their support in public and Muslims started to follow modern minds like Muhammad Ali Jinnah. To keep themselves relevant, the Deobandi clergy that was politically ambitious established a militant Deobandi organization, Majlis-i-Ahrar-i-Islam, in 1931. This organization can be considered as predecessor of Sipah-e-Sahaba Pakistan (SSP). They first agitated against the Ahmedis in Kashmir and then they were looking for an opportunity. It was provided by Molana Abdul shakoor Lakhnavi who now had established a seminary in Lucknow in 1931 right on the route of the yearly Shia procession, called Dar-ul-Mubalaghin. Molana Abdul Shakoor wrote many books and pamphlets and had debates with Shia clerics. As paper had become available in plenty, these writings spread all over subcontinent and caused incidents of violence, though negligible compared to what was happening in UP. Dhulipala says:

"The problem broke out with renewed vigour in 1936 on Ashura day when two Sunnis disobeyed orders and publicly recited Charyari in the city centre of Lucknow. They were arrested and prosecuted, but then on Chhelum day more Sunnis took part in reciting Charyari and fourteen were arrested. This led to a new agitation by the Lucknow Sunnis in favour of reciting these verses publicly, which came to be known as Madhe Sahaba".

The government appointed the Allsop committee which endorsed the decision of the Piggott committee. The Allsop committee report was published in March 1938 and was rejected by the Deobandi ulema. Mushirul Hasan says:

"It turned violent in May–June 1937, when frenzied mobs in Lucknow and Ghazipur went on a rampage. Trouble in Ghazipur was instigated by a party of Sunnis from Jaunpur. Enraged mobs burnt and looted property. They killed at will. The summer of discontent rumbled on as sectarian strife, hitherto dormant, turned into a common occurrence in the daily lives of Lucknawis. There was more trouble during the next two years, fuelled by a government-appointed committee's ruling against Madh-e Sahaba in Lucknow. All hell broke loose. Husain Ahmad Madani (1879–1957), principal of the renowned seminary at Deoband along with other Jam'iyat al-'Ulama' leaders, jumped into the fray. He advocated civil disobedience. Thousands paid heed to his call and courted arrest. Though a fervent advocate of secular nationalism and a principled critic of the «two-nation theory», he stirred sectarian passions unabashedly. He spoke at a public meeting in Lucknow on 17 March 1938 sharing the platform with the firebrand head of the Dar al-Muballighin, Maulvi 'Abdul Shakoor, and Maulana Zafarul Mulk, chief exponent of Madh-e Sahaba in Lucknow".

In April 1938, when the Chehlum procession passed in front of the newly built Madrassah Darul Mubalaghin, bricks were thrown on it from rooftop, as a result ten Shias got killed and dozens were injured. Because of modern press and faster communication, the conflict soon spread to other cities. Already in 1940, a bomb was thrown on a procession in Delhi. J. N. Hollister reports on the security situation during Muharram in 1940:

"Conflicts between Sunnis and Shias at Muharram are not infrequent. Processions in the cities are accompanied by police along fixed lines of March. The following quotations from a single newspaper are not usual. They indicate what might happen if government did not keep the situation under control:

'adequate measures avert incidents', 'Muharram passed off peacefully', 'All shops remained closed in... in order to avoid incidents', 'Several women offered satyagraha in front of the final procession... about twenty miles from Allahabad. They object to the passing of the procession through their fields', 'the police took great precautions to prevent a breach of the peace', 'as a sequel to the cane charge by the police on a Mehndi procession the Moslems... did not celebrate the Muharram today. No ta’zia processions were taken out... Business was transacted as usual in the Hindu localities', 'Bomb thrown on procession'.

Not all of these disturbances spring from sectarian differences, but those differences actuate many fracases. Birdwood says that, in Bombay, where the first four days of Muharram are likely to be devoted to visiting each other's tabut khanas, women and children as well as men are admitted, and members of other communities – only the Sunnies are denied 'simply as a police precaution'".

Justice Munir writes in his report:

"How they attempted to defeat the Muslim League with Islam as their weapon will be apparent from some utterances of Maulana Mazhar Ali Azhar, the Ahrar leader, to whom is ascribed the couplet in which the Quaid-i-Azam was called kafir-i-azam. This gentleman is a Shia, but madh-i-sahaba with him is dearer than life, and during the days of Shia-Sunni riots in Lucknow both he and his son adopted this slogan which rouses the fire of every Shia and went from Lahore to Lucknow to fan the Shia-Sunni fire. Speaking outside Bhati Gate at a public meeting of the Ahrar, he said that he had, for the preceding two or three months, been asking the Muslim League whether the names of sahaba-i-karam would be revered in Pakistan, but had received no reply. He alleged that in the Congress-governed Provinces where Government was still with the British and the League had no power, the Leaguers were not permitting the sahaba to be named with reverence and asked whether, if power passed to the League; the state of affairs would be the same as in Lucknow and other Provinces where Muslims were in a majority and madh-i- sahaba would be an offence. Proceeding, he inquired if words of praise for Hazrat Abu Bakr, Hazrat Umar and Hazrat Usman could not be uttered in Lucknow and Mahmudabad, what would be the condition in League's Pakistan and what interest the Musalmans could have in such Pakistan (vide 'Shahbaz' of 20th November 1945)? In its issue of 2nd November 1945, the 'Nawa-i-Waqt' published a letter written by this very gentleman to another Ahrar leader. As the genuineness of this letter was questioned, we examined Maulana Mazhar Ali Azhar about it. He says that he does not definitely remember having written it but since this letter was published in one of the prominent papers of Lahore and was not contradicted by him, we have no hesitation in holding that the Maulana did write this letter. It is impossible that the Maulana, a renowned leader as he was in those days, should not have been aware of the publication of this letter, and, if he failed to contradict it, the only inference can be that the 'Nawa-i-Waqt' was in possession of the original letter, the authorship of which, in case the matter came to proof, could have conclusively been proved. The subject-matter of this letter is again madh-i- sahaba and we may repeat that the Maulana himself is a Shia. In this letter the Maulana says that the weapon of madh-i-sahaba could effectively be used against the League and that both the League and the Government will have to surrender over this issue whatever might, be the result of the elections. This conduct of the Maulana shows quite clearly how the Ahrar and other parties can conveniently exploit religion for their political ends. In this connection we may also mention a similar effort made by the Muslim League itself in 1946 to have pirs and masha'ikh, who command considerable followings, on its side in the struggle for the establishment of Pakistan."

The Legacy of Madhe Sahaba Agitation 

On 3 September 1939, British Prime Minister Neville Chamberlain declared the commencement of war with Germany. Shortly thereafter, Viceroy Lord Linlithgow followed suit and announced that India too was at war with Germany. In 1939, the Congress leaders resigned from all British India government positions to which they had elected. In the 1940s, Jinnah emerged as a leader of the Indian Muslims and was popularly known as Quaid-e-Azam (‘Great Leader’). These developments and the debates about status of Muslims in future India created an environment that forced Muslims to bury their disputes and focus on more important issues. In 1944 the Deobandi clerics established a separate organization under the name of Tanzim-i-Ahle Sunnat for the purpose of attacking Shia beliefs and practices, while keeping the mainstream Deobandi leadership absolved of the blame of communalism so that they could present themselves as secular nationalists. After 1947, many students of Molana Abdul Shakoor Lakhnavi and Molana Hussain Ahmad Madani migrated to Pakistan and either set up seminaries there or became part of the Tanzim-e-Ahle Sunnat or Jamiat Ulema-i-Islam (JUI). They travelled through the length and breadth of the country and called for attacks on Shia processions and wrote books and tracts against it. Among them were: Molana Noorul Hasan Bukhari, Molana Dost Muhammad Qureshi, Molana Abdus Sattar Taunsavi, Molana Mufti Mahmood, Molana Abdul Haq Haqqani and Molana Sarfaraz Gakharvi.

Already in 1949, Muharam procession was attacked in Narowal. In the 1951 Punjab Assembly elections, voting Shia candidates was declared prohibited and they were called infidels. In 1955, mourning processions were attacked at 25 places in Punjab. In the same year, a Balti imambargah in Karachi was attacked by a Deobandi mob and twelve people were severely injured. In 1957, three mourners died when a Muharram procession was attacked in Sitpur village of Muzaffargarh district. In the same year, one person was killed and three others were seriously injured when bricks and stones were thrown at a mourning procession in Ahmadpur Sharqi. In June 1958, Agha Mohsin, a Shia orator, was assassinated in Bhakkar.

The Therhi Massacre occurred on 3 June 1963, Shias of Therhi village attempted to carry a Taziya. When this news reached the nearby Deobandi seminary of Khairpur, students of Madrassa went to Therhi and burned both Taziya and Imambargah. 120 people were butchered with meat cleavers and machetes. On the same day a mourning procession was attacked at Bhati Gate, Lahore, with stones and knives, killing two mourners and injuring about a hundred. Mourners were also attacked in Narowal, Chiniot and Quetta.

See also
Anti-Shi'ism
Genocide of Kashmiri Shias
Therhi Massacre
Persecution of Hazara people
Persecution of Shias by ISIL
Syed Ahmad Barelvi
Sipah-e-Sahaba Pakistan

References 

1906 establishments in India
1939 disestablishments in India
20th-century Islam
 
Shia Islam in Saudi Arabia
Sectarian violence
Shia–Sunni sectarian violence
Shia Muslims
Shi'a
Persecution of Muslims
Islam-related controversies
History of Lucknow
Deobandi movement
Civil disobedience